James Alan Littell (born September 28, 1955) is a former head coach of the Oklahoma State University women's basketball team. He is currently an assistant coach for the Wichita State.

Littell spent 14 seasons as the head coach at Seward County Community College, where he had a record of 418–61 and recorded nine conference titles. In 2005 he became an assistant coach at Oklahoma State under new coach Kurt Budke.

After Budke's death in a plane crash on November 17, 2011, Littell was promoted to head coach, and led the team to the 2012 Women's National Invitation Tournament championship. 

On March 7, 2022, it was announced that Littell and Oklahoma State agreed to part ways after 11 years as head coach.

Head coaching record

References

External links
Oklahoma State bio

1955 births
Living people
American men's basketball players
American women's basketball coaches
Basketball coaches from Kansas
Cameron Aggies men's basketball coaches
High school basketball coaches in the United States
Junior college women's basketball coaches in the United States
Oklahoma State Cowgirls basketball coaches
Southwestern Moundbuilders men's basketball players
Sportspeople from Wichita, Kansas